This article presents lists of the literary events and publications in 1588.

Events
January 1 – The Children of Paul's perform at the court of Queen Elizabeth I of England, probably acting John Lyly's Gallathea.
February 2 – The Children of Paul's return to the English court, probably with Lyly's Endymion.
February 28 – The gentlemen of Gray's Inn perform Thomas Hughes' play The Misfortunes of Arthur before Queen Elizabeth I of England, at Greenwich Palace.
May–December – Lope de Vega serves in the Spanish Armada, where he begins writing his epic poem La Hermosura de Angélica.
November – Marprelate Controversy: The first tract by "Martin Marprelate", known as the Epistle, appears at Molesey in England.
Venice's Biblioteca Marciana is completed by Vincenzo Scamozzi on the Piazza San Marco after more than a century of construction following a plan by the late Jacopo Sansovino.
John Dee finishes Libri mysteriorum I-XVIII (Spiritual Diaries).
Welsh author Morris Kyffin publishes the first translation into English of a comedy by Terence, Andria, in London. It is possibly the first printed English text to include an ellipsis (...) as a mark of omission.
Agostino Ramelli publishes Le diverse et artificiose Machine del Capitano Agostino Ramelli, Dal Ponte Della Tresia Ingegniero del Christianissimo Re di Francia et di Pollonia in Paris, including a design for a bookwheel to permit consultation of multiple volumes.
1588–1589 – Earliest probable date for the composition and first performance of Christopher Marlowe's The Tragicall History of the Life and Death of Doctor Faustus in London.

New books

Prose
William Allen – An Admonition to the nobility and people of England
John Dee – De heptarchia mystica
Robert Greene – Pandosto: The Triumph of Time
Thomas Hariot – A Briefe and True Report of the New Found Land of Virginia
Thomas Nashe – The Anatomie of Absurditie
William Rankins – The English Ape
Welsh Bible (translation by William Morgan)

Drama
Thomas Hughes – The Misfortunes of Arthur
George Peele – The Battle of Alcazar (first performed)

Poetry
Felipe Fernandez-Armesto – Two Prayers and a Sailor's Lilt Aboard the Spanish Armada
Heinrich Meibom – 
Jean de Sponde – Essai de quelques poèmes chrétiens

Births
April 5 – Thomas Hobbes, English philosopher (died 1679)
April 15 – Claudius Salmasius (Claude Saumaise), French classicist (died 1653)
June 11 (probably) – George Wither, English poet and pamphleteer (died 1667)
September 8 – Marin Mersenne, French theologian and philosopher (died 1648)
October 16 – Luke Wadding, Irish Franciscan annalist (died 1657)
Unknown dates
Leonard Digges (writer), English poet and Hispanist (died 1635)
Francis Higginson, English-born New England writer (died 1630)
Johannes Maccovius (Jan Makovszki), Polish theologian (died 1644)

Deaths
February 24 – Johann Weyer, Dutch demonologist (born c. 1515)
March 29 – Christian Wurstisen, Swiss theologian and historian (born 1544)
September 3 – Richard Tarlton, English actor (born 1530)
October 2 – Bernardino Telesio, Italian philosopher (born 1509)
November 1 – Jean Daurat, French poet (born 1508)
Unknown date – Sperone Speroni, Italian scholar and dramatist (born 1500)

References

Years of the 16th century in literature